Splashdown Vernon, formerly Atlantis Waterslides is a water park located in Vernon, British Columbia, a district in the Okanagan region. It has 10 slides, as well as further services. The destination's waterslide, River Riot, has been noted for its popularity. It was voted the "Best Family Fun" attraction in the Okanagan region.

Students from schools within School District 22 Vernon and School District 23 Central Okanagan attend field trips at this destination. Atlantis Waterslides is located at 7921 Greenhow Road in the Regional District of North Okanagan. The Weather Network classifies Atlantis Waterslides as an attraction.

See also 

 List of water parks

References

External links 
 

Tourist attractions in the Okanagan
Vernon, British Columbia